Fargesia robusta is a species of clumping bamboo in the family Poaceae, native to Sichuan, China. Typically  but reaching , and with a narrow growth form, it has gained the Royal Horticultural Society's Award of Garden Merit as an ornamental. A number of cultivars are commercially available, including 'Campbell', 'Pingwu' ( is derived from 'Pingwu'), 'Wenchuan', and 'Wolong'. 

It is a food source for giant pandas but grows at too low an elevation for them to exploit, unless there has been a die-off of their usual species. It is a member of the Fargesia spathacea species complex, and may not be a distinct species.

References

robusta
Endemic flora of China
Flora of South-Central China
Plants described in 1985